Check Please is the debut album by the American rock band The Influents. It was released on November 14, 2000 through Adeline Records.

Track listing
All songs written and composed by The Influents.

"Tears, Not Suicide" - 2:03
"Chain Parades" - 2:20 
"Where I'll Go" - 2:24 
"Longest Nights" - 3:22  
"Simple Girls" - 3:23 
"Not the Same" - 3:22 
"Nothing New" - 2:42  
"Up in Arms" - 2:50  
"See You Again" - 2:07  
"Show Me" - 3:15  
"Give the Anarchist a Cigarette" - 4:07

Personnel
 Jason White - vocals, guitar
 Bill Schneider - bass
 Greg Schneider - guitar, vocals
 Willie Samuels - drums

2000 debut albums
Adeline Records albums